Aleurites rockinghamensis, the candlenut, is a flowering tree in the spurge family, Euphorbiaceae found in northeastern Australia.

References

Aleuritideae
Flora of Queensland
Plants described in 1996
Taxa named by Henri Ernest Baillon